Secreted frizzled-related protein 5 is a protein that in humans is encoded by the SFRP5 gene.

Secreted frizzled-related protein 5 (SFRP5) is a member of the SFRP family that contains a cysteine-rich domain homologous to the putative Wnt-binding site of Frizzled proteins. SFRPs act as soluble modulators of Wnt signaling. SFRP5 and SFRP1 may be involved in determining the polarity of photoreceptor cells in the retina. SFRP5 is highly expressed in the retinal pigment epithelium, and moderately expressed in the pancreas.

References

Further reading